Jeffrey Clarke (born October 18, 1977) is a Canadian former professional soccer player, who is currently playing for Surrey United Firefighters and works as head coach by Surrey United Women. Clarke earned nineteen caps, scoring one goal, for the Canadian national team. He most recently played for the Vancouver Whitecaps in the First Division of the United Soccer Leagues.

Club career

Youth and college
Clarke grew up in Coquitlam, British Columbia where he played youth soccer with Coquitlam Metro-Ford SC. During his time with the team, Metro Ford won three provincial and two Canadian championships. Clarke attended Centennial School, and after graduating in 1996, attended Simon Fraser University where he played on the men's soccer team for one year. While he left college prior to completing his degree, he has since completed a degree in Criminology with a diploma in Legal Studies.

Professional
In 1997, Clarke signed with the Vancouver 86ers, becoming the team's starting sweeper. After one season in Vancouver, Clarke decided to move to Europe. After the 1997 season, he moved to Belgium, where he had a trial with Royal Antwerp. However, the first of several work permit problems prevented him from signing with Antwerp. In 1998, he joined League of Ireland club St. Patrick's Athletic F.C. He scored his only goal against Bray Wanderers in May 1999 to clinch the league title for St. Pats.

After the 1999 season, Clarke moved again, this time to the Hampton Roads Mariners. At the time, he was attempting to join clubs in several European leagues, including England, Denmark, and Austria, but, once again, he had difficulty gaining a work permit. In July 2000, he signed with Longford Town. However, he left the team and returned to Canada in August when Canadian national team coach Holger Osieck threatened to not call him into the national team.  Clarke then decided to sign with the Edmonton Drillers of the National Professional Soccer League (NPSL). However, the Drillers folded in December 2000, halfway through the NPSL season. The Baltimore Blast then selected Clarke in a dispersal draft. When the Blast were eliminated from the playoffs, he joined the Portland Timbers on February 14, 2001. In 2002, he returned to the Vancouver Whitecaps.

As team captain, he helped the Whitecaps capture their first USL First Division Championship, beating the Rochester Raging Rhinos 3 to 0 in the championship. After the game, he was named the Championship's MVP. On October 12, 2008, he helped the Whitecaps capture their second USL First Division Championship, beating the Puerto Rico Islanders 2–1 in Vancouver but he was released from the team on December 8, 2008.

International career
Clarke played at the 1993 FIFA U-17 World Championship in Japan, in a team alongside Paul Stalteri and Jason Bent. He then also played at the 1997 FIFA World Youth Championship in Malaysia, again with Stalteri and Bent.

He made his senior debut for Canada in an August 1997 friendly match against China. He earned a total of 19 caps, scoring 1 goal. He has represented Canada in 2 FIFA World Cup qualification matches. He was part of Canada's squad that won the 2000 CONCACAF Gold Cup, a first for the nation. In 2000, he was the captain of the Canadian Olympic side as it attempted, but failed to qualify for the 2000 Summer Olympics.

His final international was a May 2002 friendly match against Switzerland.

International goals
Scores and results list Canada's goal tally first.

Coaching career
Clarke served as an assistant coach with Simon Fraser University. He is currently serving as the Technical Director and Director of Operations of Surrey United Soccer Club where he has been since 2009. In his 14 years at Surrey United SC, Jeff has been the driving force behind the SUSC BCSPL Program that has been regarded as one of the top programs in the country with numerous national championships. He has established a club-wide model that has fully integrated player development, academy programs and team development programs as well as levels of play from under 5 years old to over 55-year-old masters programs.  Jeff was formerly the Technical Director of the Guildford Athletic Club and was instrumental in rebuilding their soccer program.

Honours
Canada
CONCACAF Gold Cup: (1): 2000
CONCACAF U-20 Championship (1): 1996

Vancouver Whitecaps FC
USL First Division Championship (2): 2006, 2008

St. Patrick's Athletic
League of Ireland: (2): 1997–98, 1998–99

References

External links
 
 Portland Timbers stats
 
 

1977 births
Living people
People from Coquitlam
Black Canadian soccer players
Association football midfielders
Soccer people from British Columbia
Canadian soccer players
Canada men's international soccer players
CONCACAF Gold Cup-winning players
2001 FIFA Confederations Cup players
Canadian expatriate soccer players
Canadian expatriate sportspeople in Ireland
Canadian expatriate sportspeople in the United States
Simon Fraser Clan men's soccer players
Vancouver Whitecaps (1986–2010) players
St Patrick's Athletic F.C. players
Virginia Beach Mariners players
Edmonton Drillers (1996–2000) players
Baltimore Blast (NPSL) players
Portland Timbers (2001–2010) players
Vancouver Whitecaps Residency players
League of Ireland players
National Professional Soccer League (1984–2001) players
USL First Division players
USL League Two players
Expatriate association footballers in the Republic of Ireland
Expatriate soccer players in the United States
Canada men's youth international soccer players
Canada men's under-23 international soccer players
A-League (1995–2004) players